Juan de Santiago y León Garabito (July 13, 1641 – July 12, 1694) was a Roman Catholic prelate who served as Bishop of Guadalajara (1677–1694) and Bishop of Puerto Rico (1676–1677).

Biography
Juan de Santiago y León Garabitoa was born in Archidona, Spain. In 1676, he was appointed by the King of Spain as Bishop of Puerto Rico. On June 7, 1677, he was selected by the King of Spain and confirmed by Pope Innocent XI on September 13, 1677 as Bishop of Guadalajara. On May 22, 1678, he was consecrated bishop by Manuel Fernández de Santa Cruz y Sahagún, Bishop of Tlaxcala. He served as Bishop of Guadalajara until his death on July 12, 1694.

References

External links and additional sources
 (for Chronology of Bishops) 
 (for Chronology of Bishops) 
 (for Chronology of Bishops) 
 (for Chronology of Bishops) 

1641 births
1694 deaths
Bishops appointed by Pope Innocent XI
17th-century Roman Catholic bishops in Mexico
17th-century Roman Catholic bishops in Puerto Rico
Roman Catholic bishops of Puerto Rico